Ivan Antonovich Kupreyanov (1794 – 20 April 1857), also spelled in English as Kupreanof, was the head of the Russian-American Company in Russian America from 1835 to 1840. Kupreyanov entered the Sea Cadet Corps while being only 10, in 1809. 

Kupreyanov served on the Mirny under captain Mikhail Lazarev during a circumnavigation led by Fabian Gottlieb von Bellingshausen. Besides the discovery of Antarctica, island chains in the Pacific and Southern Oceans. He participated in an additional circumnavigation by Lazarev that lasted through 1822 to 1824. With the rank of Captain lieutenant Kupreyanov commanded a frigate and fought in the Black Sea against the Ottoman Navy during the Russo-Turkish War (1828–29).

Kupreyanov and his wife, Yuliya Ivanovna, began a school for native girls in Sitka. It was closed at the end of his administration but was reopened later. He built the famous residence, library and museum in New Archangel called Baranof's Castle by early American settlers, who assumed that it had been built by Alexandr Baranov, Kupreyanov's predecessor by eighteen years. The residence was the site of the ceremony in which control of Russian America was transferred from Russia to the United States in 1867. Although the residence fell down in 1897, the hill where it was located is still called Castle Hill. Kupreyanov greeted the British captain Edward Belcher  in 1837, who was commanding surveying expedition of two ships, HMS Sulphur and HMS Starling. Belcher recorded that "his civilities were overpowering." Departing from New Archangel on 30 September 1840 with his family, Kupreyanov continued his career in the Imperial Russian Navy. He was promoted to vice admiral in October 1852.

Legacy
Kupreanof Island in the Alexander Archipelago (the Alaska Panhandle) was named after him, and indirectly the city of Kupreanof, Alaska, which is on that island.

References

Governors of the Russian-American Company
19th-century people from the Russian Empire
Explorers from the Russian Empire
1800 births
1857 deaths
Naval Cadet Corps alumni